Speed skating has been featured as a sport in the Asian Winter Games since the first winter games in 1986.

Editions

Events

Medal table

Participating nations

List of medalists

References 

 
Asian Winter Games
Sports at the Asian Winter Games
International speed skating competitions